Umezaki (written: 梅崎) is a Japanese surname. Notable people with the surname include:

, Japanese writer
, Japanese video game producer

Japanese-language surnames